WVAR is an American radio station located in Richwood, West Virginia that plays a classic hits format.

The station also carries West Virginia University basketball and Richwood High School sports. While it simulcasts sister station WSGB full-time, WVAR breaks away for sports broadcasts.

History

As WMNF
WVAR first went on the air on November 16, 1957, and first broadcast at 1280 AM under the call letters WMNF.  The original owner was Royal Broadcasting Company, of which Herman Dotson served as president and Art Grunewald as general manager.  Studios were located along Cemetery Road in Richwood.  By 1959, the call letters were changed to WVAR, as they remain today.

As WVAR
On January 1, 1965, WVAR was sold to R & S Broadcasting.  Carl Gainer was the new company president, and Virgil Graves became General Manager.  In 1968, WVAR moved from its dial position of 1280 kHz to 600 kHz.  The station retained its daytime-only broadcast hours and output power of 1,000 watts.

In 1991, WVAR moved its studios and offices to 713 Main Street in Summersville, but would maintain a local presence in Richwood at 2 Rhododendron Drive, formerly known as Cemetery Road.  On December 24, 1996, after more than 30 years of ownership, WVAR was sold by R & S Broadcasting to J & K Broadcasting.  The ownership change also resulted in the pairing of an FM sister station, WAFD, which had gone on the air earlier that year with a southern and country gospel format.

In mid-February 2003, an ice storm that ravaged the southern part of West Virginia toppled the WVAR broadcasting antenna atop Hinkle Mountain which overlooks Richwood. In the following summer the station and its owner raised funds to erect a new antenna.  The station was closed with a dark license while funds were sought to replace it.

On March 13, 2007, J & K Broadcasting, Inc. sold WVAR to Summit Media Broadcasting, LLC for $1.24 million in a transaction that included sister FM station WAFD in Webster Springs.  Summit Media also owns WDBS-FM and WSGB-AM.  Studios were moved to 202 Back Fork Street in Webster Springs.

On May 15, 2007, WVAR dropped its country format and began simulcasting sister WSGB-AM's oldies format as "The Mighty 1490".  That October, Summit Media filed an application with the FCC to waive main studio requirements for WVAR, which would allow on-air operations to be co-located with WSGB and other stations in Summit Media's ownership group.

Two months later, another application was filed informing the FCC that Summit Media had taken the station silent due to Summit Media's inability to successfully meet FCC-required staffing needs at the Webster Springs studio.  The FCC granted the application to keep the station silent in January 2008 until granting permission for the studio waiver later that year.  However, Summit Media kept the station silent for another year due to technical renovations being delayed due to the lack of available workforce.

Translator
In November 2009, Summit Media filed an application to rebroadcast WVAR's signal over FM translator W251AY, licensed to Birch River.  The translator, licensed to operate at 98.1 MHz, broadcasts at 250 watts at a height of 256 m above average terrain.  The translator, which has been on the air since 2004, had been previously used to rebroadcast the signal of sister FM station WDBS.

External links
WVAR/WSBG Online
1997 Broadcasting and Cable Yearbook

Radio stations established in 1957
VAR